In military terms, 21st Brigade may refer to:

Australia
 21st Brigade (Australia)

Germany
 21st Panzer Brigade (Bundeswehr)

Greece
 21st Armoured Brigade (Greece)
 21st Brigade (Greece)

India
 21st Indian Infantry Brigade

United Kingdom
 21st Army Tank Brigade
 21st Brigade (United Kingdom)
 21st Mounted Brigade (United Kingdom)

See also
 21st Division (disambiguation)
 21st Regiment (disambiguation)
 21 Squadron (disambiguation)